Balbinot may refer to:

 48715 Balbinot, a minor planet discovered on September 13, 1996 in Bologna, Italy
 Balbinot 1, a low-luminosity globular cluster in the constellation of Pegasus.
 Diego Balbinot (born 1984), former Brazilian footballer with Italian Passport